Conford is a hamlet in the civil parish of Bramshott and Liphook.  It lies near the large village of Liphook.

External links
Conford at Streetmap.co.uk

External links

Villages in Hampshire